The 2010–11 Liga de Nuevos Talentos season was split in two tournaments Independencia and Revolución. Liga de Nuevos Talentos was the fourth–tier football league of Mexico. The season was played between 13 August 2010 and 21 May 2011.

Teams

Group 1

Group 2 
{{Location map+ |Mexico |width=700|float=right |caption=Location of teams in the 2010–11 LNT Group 2 |places=

Torneo Independencia

Regular season

Group 1

League table

Results

Group 2

League table

Results

Liguilla

Quarter-finals

First leg

Second leg

Semi-finals

First leg

Second leg

Final

First leg

Second leg

Torneo Revolución

Regular season

Group 1

League table

Results

Group 2

League table

Results

Liguilla

Quarter-finals

First leg

Second leg

Semi-finals

First leg

Second leg

Final

First leg

Second leg

Relegation Table 

Last updated: 31 March 2011 Source: Liga Premier FMFP = Position; G = Games played; Pts = Points; Pts/G = Ratio of points to games played

Promotion Final
The Promotion Final is a series of matches played by the champions of the tournaments Apertura and Clausura, the game was played to determine the winning team of the promotion to Liga Premier de Ascenso. The first leg was played on 14 May 2011, and the second leg was played on 21 May 2011.

First leg

Second leg

See also 
2010–11 Mexican Primera División season
2010–11 Liga de Ascenso season
2010–11 Liga Premier de Ascenso season

References

External links 
 Official website of Liga Premier
 Magazine page 

 
1